Kattenvenne is a village in Germany (North Rhine-Westphalia) about 23 km northeast from Münster. It is part of the municipality Lienen.

History 
The name Kattenvenne is first mentioned in a contract of the year 836 in which it is called "Hadunveni"(Latin). A second mentioning is found in a document of 1312. In the Middle Ages Kattenvenne was known for its peat moors. In the 18th century 23 farms were documented here.

The very first development of the village followed the construction of the railroad between Münster and Osnabrück (1868–1871). Some prisoners of the French-German War (1870) must have been working here,  too. In 1873 the Kattenvenne railway station was built.  The first stone of the church was laid in 1887 and the building was finished in the following year. Already at Christmas 1887 the first service was held in the unfinished building by Pastor Philipps. In 1897 a tower was added on the front of the church. 
Since the end of the 19th century economy developed rapidly. As a consequence the population more than tripled within the next 130 years, even though 400 persons emigrated to North America and 230 died in the two world wars.

Sports 
The Kattenvenne handball team TVK 1927 plays in the North Rhine-Westphalia Pampers League.

References 
Hunsche F.E.: Lienen am Teutoburger Wald; Lengericher Handelsdruckerei, 1965.

Villages in North Rhine-Westphalia